William "Billo" Rees (14 April 1899 – 1968) was a Welsh rugby union, and professional rugby league footballer who played in the 1920s and 1930s.

Background
Billo Rees was born in Glanamman, Carmarthenshire, and he died aged 68.

Playing career

International honours
Billo Rees won 6 caps for Wales (RL) in 1926–1930 while at Swinton, and won caps for Great Britain (RL) while at Swinton in 1926 against New Zealand, in 1927 against New Zealand, in 1928 against Australia (3 matches), New Zealand (3 matches), in 1929 against Australia (2 matches), in 1930 against Australia.

County Cup Final appearances
Billo Rees played  in Swinton's 15–11 victory over Wigan in the 1925 Lancashire County Cup Final during the 1925–26 season at The Cliff, Broughton, Salford on Wednesday 9 December 1925 (postponed from Saturday 21 November 1925 due to fog), played  in the 5–2 victory over Wigan in the 1927 Lancashire County Cup Final during the 1927–28 season at Watersheddings, Oldham on Saturday 19 November 1927.

Genealogical information
Rees was the younger brother of the rugby union footballer; Joe Rees.

References

External links
!Great Britain Statistics at englandrl.co.uk (statistics currently missing due to not having appeared for both Great Britain, and England)
The Centenary History of Amman United Rugby Football Club, 1903–2003

1899 births
1968 deaths
Amman United RFC players
Footballers who switched code
Great Britain national rugby league team players
People from Glanamman
Place of death missing
Rugby league five-eighths
Rugby league halfbacks
Rugby league players from Carmarthenshire
Rugby union players from Carmarthenshire
Swinton Lions players
Wales national rugby league team players
Welsh rugby league players
Welsh rugby union players